The Isotta Fraschini Asso 200 was a water-cooled inline engine developed by Isotta Fraschini in the late 1920s.

Design and development
Fabrica Automobili Isotta Fraschini (Isotta Fraschini) was founded in 1898 to manufacture cars and internal combustion engines. Isotta Fraschini engines powered many Italian airships and military aircraft during WWI, becoming one of the largest engine producers in Italy. At the outbreak of WWII Isotta Fraschini had a large portfolio of engines but suffered from a lack of large orders, with a few exceptions.

The Asso 200 had cylinders made of carbon steel separated from each other, joined by a single aluminum head. The cylinders with the related cylinder heads, the upper crankcase, the crankshaft and the pistons were identical to the other engines in the series.

Applications

Breda A.2
Breda A.9
Breda Ba.25/Mezzo-Asso
CANT 7ter
CANT 18 and 18bis
CANT 22
CANT 23
CANT 36
Macchi M.7
Macchi M.18

Specifications

See also

References

1920s aircraft piston engines
Asso 200